The Imatra Society was a society of Finnish immigrants located in Brooklyn, New York. The society was founded by John A. Koski, a building engineer. A preliminary meeting was held on December 6, 1890, and was followed by the founding meeting held on December 14, 1890.

At the beginning: a workers' association

At the beginning the society operated as a workers' association with the name of Workers' Association Imatra. Women were participating in the activities from the beginning. As a first act in the business the society established its own brass band. In addition a chorus and a theater group were formed.

In October 1892 the chairman Koski informed the meeting of the society with the following: "A failure of crops has taken place in our native country Finland and a famine is imminent there, so it should be our duty, as we are in these better circumstances, to begin a kind of relief for the hunger." This statement was unanimously approved.

In February 1903 the society founded an Imatra League which was a Finnish American workers' union consisting of about 40 subdivisions across the United States and Canada. The total membership in the league was approximately 2,000 members. The league published its own newspaper called Työväen Album (the worker's album). The Imatra League was abolished in February 1917.

On June 10, 1906, Imatra Society began to publish its own newspaper, the New Yorkin Uutiset.

In 1906 Imatra Society consisted of the following units: a discussion club, a theater group, a women's club, a brass band, an entertainment committee, a library, and a reading-room.

In fall 1907 the society began to collect money for the crofters of the estate Laukko in Finland "who had got into distress because they were fired out from their crofts."

Imatra Hall 

The society built its own house for their activities and moved into it on November 1, 1908. Opening celebration was held on November 18 and 19. They also supplied to their new house a generator to produce electricity. "This was a historical event in the Finntown hill and caused a lot of talk in the neighbourhood since it was the Imatra Society that brought the first electric lights to the buck hill" (now the Sunset Park area). This house, later called Imatra Hall, was most important place for the activities of the society and became well known and very popular among the Finnish people.

In December 1908 the society maintained a cause of temperance. No alcoholic drinks were allowed to be brought to the hall and nobody was allowed to appear under the influence of alcohol. Also smoking was absolutely forbidden in the restaurant.

Imatra Society established an employment agency by the proposal of Matti Kurikka. The agency began its operation on December 1, 1910. In a year the agency exchanged a job to about 50–60 men and 135 women. In service occupations for women there were much more open vacancies than there were applicants. In 1912 the agency exchanged 242 jobs.

In 1910 the theater group of the society performed several plays in Imatra Hall, such as Pimeyden valta (the power of darkness), Charleyn Tähti (the star of Charley), Jeppe Niilonpoika (Jeppe the Nilsson), Tukkijoella (on the log river), Roinilan Talossa (in the house of Roinila), and Viimeinen Ponnistus (the last effort). As special performances they performed Kristitty (the Christian) and Kun piiat ovat lakossa (when the hired girls are on strike).

Aid society and national society 
In the annual meeting of the society on January 20, 1918, new clauses were made for the bylaw of the society such as: Clause 8 – The society tries to do its best to make Finnish people well known in the United States. Clause 9 – Officially the society is known as the Finnish Aid Society Imatra. Clause 22 – If the society dissolves or its operation becomes so weak that there is a fear for withdrawal of the society, do not move or sell the property of the society without a special permit from the Senate of Finland. This clause must not be changed.

Originally the society was a workers' association, then it became an aid society, and in July 1921 it was named as Kansallisseura Imatra (National Society Imatra).

May 13. 1923 the Imatra Society sends a group of seven people to Ellis Island to help the Finnish immigrants in the landing process.

Visitors from Finland 
Visitors from Finland, such as artists and others, have been an important part in the activities of the Imatra Hall. Many Finnish artists have performed a concert at Imatra Hall including such famous artists as: Uuno Klami on October 27, 1917, Alfred Tanner on May 29, 1924, Robert Kajanus on January 11, 1925, Lea Piltti on April 24, 1949, Tapio Rautavaara on October 22, 1959, Henry Theel on February 2, 1973, and Heimo Haitto on January 24, 1984.

Other important persons who have visited in Imatra Hall include such as Paavo Nurmi on February 19, 1966, Anne Pohtamo on February 5, 1978,  the minister of education Kaarina Suonio with her delegation on September 13, 1982, the president of Finland Mauno Koivisto and Mrs. Tellervo Koivisto with their delegation on October 25, 1985, and the minister of education Christoffer Taxell with his delegation on April 10, 1988.

Imatra Society held a festival on December 8, 1935, to celebrate Sibelius on his birthday. The festival was a great success. Minister Järnefelt also attended it.

For the first 50 years the society operated as a temperance society but now it decided to obtain a liquor licence and the bar of the Imatra Hall began its operation on August 27, 1941.

Juho Rissanen, a famous painter visited Imatra Hall on October 1, 1946, and was asking if the society would order a wallpainting from him for the Imatra Hall.

On January 23, 1949, it is informed that Imatra society had sent to Finland a number of packages to institutions of poor people and to seven families and furthermore will be tried to help the poor and the orphans of Finland.

A survey for the situation of the society in 1959: "As you remember this year began with very difficult circumstances since we were nearly losing our house to the tumult of the foreign stuff and occasionally it was very difficult for our own members to get in. It was really needed to take the matter with iron hands since a real cleaning had to be bring about. We succeeded rather well with this and already the peacefulness and order began to return…" Within the society there were many times discussed whether or not non Finns are accepted to become members of the Imatra Society. Now it was finally clear they are not accepted.

The Imatra Society began to arrange Miss Finlandia beauty contests. The first was held on October 6, 1968. Since 1970 Finnair donated to the winner a return flight ticket to Finland.

A group of actors from the National Theater of Finland led by Sakari Jurkka performed a comedy Myöhästynyt hääyö (the delayed wedding night) at Imatra Hall on June 2, 1971. The performance was a great success and therefore it was rerun at Imatra Hall on June 27.

For the first 95 years the language of the society was Finnish but since the annual meeting on February 16, 1986, the language has been English because there were non Finnish members in the society who did not understand Finnish.

In 1987 the society was planning to establish an annual music festival at Imatra Hall where Finnish and American artists could perform. This was a big plan and therefore an inquiry was made to music festivals in Finland if they can come along and participate in organizing the festival in New York. Many of them responded favorably.

There was a concert at Imatra Hall on March 7, 1991, in which two police choruses performed, one was the west coast police chorus from Finland with 60 singers and the other the New York City police chorus with 40 male and female singers.

The 100 anniversary celebration of the society lasted for four days and was held on September 19–22, 1991. In connection with the celebration the 40th Street in front of the Imatra Hall was co-named as Finlandia Street. In the occasion the Finlandia hymn of Sibelius was performed by the Male Singers of Järvenpää from Finland. After this a flag procession with national costumes led the people to the Imatra Hall, where the main event was held.

Only a few years after the 100 anniversary celebration the Imatra Society had come into financial difficulties and in fall 1995 it was so much involved in debt that it was no more able to recover. Imatra Hall was sold and then Imatra Foundation was established with the remaining property. The Imatra Society was suppressed on April 26, 1996.

Presidents

Photos from the activities of the society

References

Further reading
 New Yorkin Uutiset: ”Imatra Hall draws crowd of people”, p. 4. December 13, 1988.
 New Yorkin Uutiset: ”Come all to support new, splendid Imatra!”, p. 3. February 14, 1989. 
 New York Newsday: ”A Little Bit of Scandinavia Club recalls Sunset Park´s past”, p. 27. February 27, 1992.

Organizations based in Brooklyn
History of New York (state)
Society of Finland
Finnish-American culture